The Old Cuban was created in 2001 by mixologist Audrey Saunders. It is also an IBA official cocktail.

See also
 List of cocktails

References

External links
 

Cocktails with rum
Cocktails with bitters